Tuu'u Anasii Leota is a Samoan politician and former Cabinet Minister. Previously a member of the Human Rights Protection Party,  he is now an independent.

Leota was an accountant. He worked for the Treasury as Controller Of Stores/Assistant Secretary of Stores before resigning to run for Parliament. He was first elected to the Legislative Assembly of Samoa in 1996. In 2004 he was appointed Minister of Revenue in a Cabinet reshuffle following the death of Seumanu Aita Ah Wa. He was reappointed after the 2006 election. He ran unsuccessfully for deputy leader of the HRPP after the 2011 election, and was not reappointed to Cabinet. 

In June 2013 Leota outraged the Samoan Parliament by using offensive language during a debate. In February 2014 RNZ reported that he was one of three Samoan MPs who had left the ruling HRPP to form a new party after a dispute over abuse of power by Finance Minister Faumuina Tiatia Liuga. Leota claimed that he was still a member of the HRPP, and later claimed the report that he was leaving the HRPP was a joke.

He lost his seat at the 2016 election. He was re-elected in the 2021 election.

On 3 November 2022 Tuu'u and fellow MP Ale Vena Ale resigned from the HRPP to become independents, saying they did not want to remain in a party led by a leader guilty of contempt of court.

References

Year of birth missing (living people)
Living people
Members of the Legislative Assembly of Samoa
Government ministers of Samoa
Human Rights Protection Party politicians